Rosmit Mantilla (born 13 December 1982) is a Venezuelan politician, who was elected to the National Assembly of Venezuela in the 2015 Venezuelan parliamentary election. He is noted as the first openly gay politician ever elected to the National Assembly.

Detention 
He is a member of the Voluntad Popular party. An LGBT rights activist, Mantilla was arrested in May 2014 during the 2014–15 Venezuelan protests against the government of Nicolás Maduro. He was detained at El Helicoide.

He was declared a prisoner of conscience by Amnesty International, which lobbied for his release. Along with Renzo Prieto and Gilberto Sojo, he was one of three people elected to the National Assembly in the 2015 election who were still in jail on election day due to charges stemming from the 2014 protests.

On November 11, 2016 it was reported that he was transferred to the Military Hospital because of a delicate health condition.  A few months earlier it had been reported he had gallstones and was very ill.  On November 15, 2016 his mother, Ingrid Flores, reported he had been transferred once again but this time to the Urólogico San Román to treat a stomach infection that was affecting his pancreas. On November 17, 2016 he was finally released after two and a half years in prison. In an interview with the digital site Panorama he said he would take a few days off to be with his family and was quoted as saying, "I am filled with hope and my commitment to Venezuela is stronger than ever. I will continue to fight for human rights and to achieve freedom for Venezuela and other prisoners of conscience. This is why I want to thank those that helped me be here today".

In 2020, he left Popular Will citing differences with the party's leadership. He has been a member of the centre-right Encuentro Ciudadano party since then.

See also
LGBT rights in Venezuela
List of the first LGBT holders of political offices

References

Members of the National Assembly (Venezuela)
Gay politicians
Popular Will politicians
Venezuelan LGBT rights activists
Venezuelan LGBT politicians
Venezuelan gay men
Living people
Venezuelan democracy activists
1982 births
Amnesty International prisoners of conscience held by Venezuela
Prisoners and detainees of Venezuela
Venezuelan politicians convicted of crimes
LGBT legislators